The World Mission Society Church of God is a new religious movement that is influenced by the Church of God (Seventh-Day) and originated in South Korea in 1964. After Ahn Sahng-hong died in 1985, Kim Joo-cheol and Zahng Gil-jah changed the church's name to Witnesses of Ahn Sahng-hong Church of God. Thereafter, the Church expanded its activities to other parts of the world, and began using the name World Mission Society Church of God. Its headquarters as well as its main church are located in the southeast of the Seoul metropolitan area (see end of infobox).

The church believes in Christ Ahn Sahng-hong, as well as God the Mother, Zahng Gil-jah, as God. The church also believes it is restoring the truth of the early church.

Name 
World Mission Society Church of God, or short Church of God, is the name used identically in affiliated churches distributed in Europe, Asia, Africa, Oceania, North America and South America.

History 
Ahn Sahng-hong founded Church of God Jesus Witnesses in South Korea on 28 April 1964. After Ahn Sahng-hong died in February 1985, a group of people in the Church of God Jesus Witnesses including the man Kim Joo-cheol and the woman Zahng Gil-jah wanted to re-introduce the concept of a “spiritual mother”, and on 22 March 1985 moved from Busan to Seoul. On a meeting in Seoul on 2 June 1985, they discussed how to call Zahng Gil-jah, and established a church called Witnesses of Ahn Sahng-hong Church of God which is led by Kim Joo-cheol and Zahng Gil-jah. Two major new doctrines were codified

 Ahn Sahng-hong should be regarded as Jesus Christ who had already come, should be titled Christ Ahn Sahng-hong, and pursuant to a traditional trinitarian view of Christian hypostasis Ahn was consequently also The Holy Spirit, God the Father, and thus God.
 Zahng Gil-jah should be regarded as God the Mother, a female image of God, be titled Heavenly Mother, or simply Mother, and together with Ahn Sahng-hong be regarded as God (for which the church commonly uses the Hebrew plural word: Elohim).

A change in religious practice, as reflected in the change of name from “Jesus Witnesses” to “Witnesses of Ahn Sahng-hong”, was, that prayers were no longer conducted in the name of Jesus Christ but in the name of Christ Ahn Sahng-hong.

Around 1997, Witnesses of Ahn Sahng-hong Church of God had established a non-profit organization titled the World Mission Society Church of God for the purpose of registering and managing the organization's assets.

Development

South Korea  
In 1970, the church grew to four churches. In 1980, the church grew to 13 locations and increased to 30 in 1990. There was sharp increase of the growth in 2000 where it recorded 300 established churches and 400,000 registered members in South Korea. The church currently claims “more than 400 branches were established in Korea alone, within a half century after its establishment.”

Abroad 
The Church of God started to spread abroad in 1997 starting in Los Angeles, Lahore, and Essen. In 2007 it recorded over 100 churches abroad and in 2008 it recorded over one million registered members. By 2013 the church claims to have expanded to 2,500 churches in “about 175 countries.”

Current status 
A media outlet owned by the Church of God reports to have more than 7,500 churches, 3.3 million registered members  in the world 175 countries.

An external account mentions that the number of church members is estimated to have only been around 100,000 in 2013, contrary to Kim Joo-cheol's claims.

Beliefs and practices 
The church believes in God the Father and God the Mother, claiming to be restoring the truth and practices of the early Church. The church also believes that co-founder Zahng Gil-jah is God the Mother, as taught by the founder Ahn Sahng-hong.

The World Mission Society Church of God believes that all of its teachings are based on the Bible, as explained in the numerous books written by Ahn Sahng-hong.

Second coming of Christ 
The Church believes that Ahn Sahng-hong is the Second Coming of Jesus, who came with a new name, the name of the Holy Spirit and it states that he fulfilled biblical prophecies that only Jesus could have fulfilled.

In addition, the church believes that the Elohim (meaning “Gods”) created all things in heaven and earth, created men and women in accordance with Gods' image, proving the existence of God in male images and God in female images, and claimed that the bride and Jerusalem represented Mother God Zahng Gil-jah.

Feast days 
The church celebrates the seven feasts described in Leviticus 23: Passover, Unleavened Bread, First Fruits, Feast of Weeks, Feast of Trumpets, Day of Atonement, and Feast of Tabernacles. The church believes that they observe these feasts according to the New Covenant established by Jesus, by distinguishing from the feasts kept in the Old Testament.

Sabbath 

It believes in the Saturday Sabbath according to Genesis 2:1-3 but celebrates it not from sunset to sunset but from sunrise to sunset.

Members are encouraged to keep the three services on the Sabbath day. Between services, members participate in various church-related activities such as Bible studies, watching church produced videos, or preaching in the local community.

Idolatry 

The Church has likewise removed stained glass windows from existing churches, as images made of light are seen as being connected to sun worship.

Human origin and redemption 
The Church believes that all human beings were originally created as angels in Heaven. They sinned against God and were sent to Earth as a second chance to return to God. The only way for humans to return to heaven is by keeping the Passover with bread and wine (Jesus' flesh and blood) and following the teachings of the Bible, as taught by Ahn Sahng-hong. They include believing in God the Mother, who is the Bride to give them life in the last days.

Baptism 
The World Mission Society Church of God holds that baptism is the first step towards salvation and must be done in the name of the Father (Jehovah), of the Son (Jesus), and the name of the Holy Spirit, believed to be Ahn Sahng-hong.

Prayer 
The Church believes that prayer must be done in the name of the Holy Spirit Ahn Sahng-hong in the last days and that women must wear veils, according to  while they pray.

Evangelism 
Members travel from house to house and in shopping malls, hospitals and college campuses to share their beliefs in the bible.

Critics note that the group's recruiting efforts can be very aggressive, and target vulnerable people, especially those going through a major life transition or with a void in their lives. Some have alleged that the group targets those with greater access to money. College students and returning veterans have been particularly targeted.

Some aggressive WMSCOG recruiters have created concern on college campuses, where young women seem to be their primary target, proselytized emphatically with the church's “Mother God” doctrine. Some of these recruiters have been banned from some college campuses in the U.S. for “trespassing” or proselytizing without permission.

Comparisons to traditional Christianity 
The World Mission Society Church of God holds many views differing from mainstream Christianity. The church says it observes holy days according to the dates of the sacred calendar in the Old Testament as the early church did in the time of Jesus. They also believe that God the Father and God the Mother have come in the flesh in South Korea, according to Bible prophesies. These beliefs have attracted some criticism of the church. The church teaches that this is the same persecution that the early Christians received for believing in Jesus in the flesh at his first coming.

Responding to an inquiry, the WMSCOG issued a statement that “the biggest difference between our Church and other churches” is that “we believe in God the Mother as well as God the Father. (…) According to the prophecies of the Bible, God the Mother is to appear in the last age of redemption.”

The deification of Ahn Sahng-hong and Zahng Gil-jah has been “harshly criticized,” and has led to the church being officially condemned by the National Council of Churches in Korea as an interdenominationally combatted, blasphemous, heretical cult. The Christian Council of Korea, which represents Protestant churches in South Korea, has denounced the WMSCOG as “heretical.”

Awards 
UK ZION, a World Mission Society Church of God chapter, was awarded The Queen's Award for Voluntary Service in 2016.

Criticism and controversy 
The World Mission Society Church of God is one of many controversial grassroots religious movements that have rapidly emerged in South Korea the latter half of the 20th century. Other groups include the Good News Mission (also known as Guwonpa) and the Shincheonji Church. These groups have been criticized for their recruitment strategies where women, university students, and ethnic minorities are targeted.

The group has been publicly criticized, by some former members and cult researchers, as acting like a cult, exercising unusual control over its members, separating them from family and friends, and exploiting them excessively, while violating laws and avoiding transparency and accountability.

1988 failed doomsday prophecy 
Witnesses of Ahn Sahng-hong Church of God announced that “1988 is the end of the world” citing , as Ahn had done in his 1980 book The Mystery of God and the Spring of the Water of Life. A few thousand members of Witnesses of Ahn Sahng-hong Church of God gathered on a mountain in Sojeong-myeon, Yeongi County, South Chungcheong Province awaiting the coming of Christ Ahn Sahng-hong, preparing for the rapture and the salvation of 144,000 souls. When Ahn failed to appear and nothing happened the church updated their apocalyptic forecast and scheduled it to the opening of the 1988 Olympics in Seoul later that year where the members gathered and preached the end of the world would come by the end of 1988 and that Ahn Sahng Hong would come again. The WMSCOG later claimed it was a fulfillment of the preaching of Jonah.

At least two former members in South Korea accused Zahng Gil-jah and Kim Joo-cheol who declared 1988, 1999 and 2012 as the end of the world in order to defraud members for more wealth.

Change in Ahn Sahng-hong's book 
The Mystery of God and the Spring of the Water of Life (1980) is 38 chapters in total. The WMSCOG removed three chapters from “The Mystery of God and the Spring of the Water of Life”, namely Chapter 1: Restoration of Jerusalem and the Prophecy of 40 Years, Chapter 11: Let Us Reveal the Truth from the History Books About the Church, and Chapter 36: Elijah Will Be Sent

The “New Covenant Passover Church of God” (NCPCOG) which is the group that has split with the WMSCOG, claimed that the WMSCOG had changed the first edition dates of “The Mystery of God and the Spring of the Water of Life”, “The Last Plagues and the Seal of God” and “Visitors from the Angelic World” to 1967 once upon a time. The NCPCOG also refuted the claim by the WMSCOG that Ahn Sahng-hong had the book “The Law of Moses and the Law of Christ”, and said that Ahn Sahng-hong has never published this book, but it seems to have been compiled with reference to Ahn Sahng-hong's book “The New Testament and the Old Testament”.

People magazine inquiry 
In December 2015, People magazine published an interview with former member Michele Colon, who had attended the WMSCOG church in Ridgewood, New Jersey for two years, and later sued the organization. Colon, who was generally contradicted by the church but generally corroborated in interviews with six other former WMSCOG members, described the WMSCOG as a “doomsday cult” that is “opportunistic.” She said they try to recruit people who are going through a life transition period, or have a void in their lives “and they will fill it.” She said WMSCOG manipulated members with “fear and guilt,” and constant repetitions. She reported that the church “micromanaged” her life, and expected that all her time be spent there, controlling her music-listening and forbidding her from using the internet.

Colon said church leaders do not tell members, until they seem fully committed, that their “God the Mother” is actually a living South Korean woman in her 70s, known by multiple names and various spiritual titles, who is apparently the widow of the deceased founder, Ahn Sahng-hong.

At least one former member has sued them for urging her to have an abortion, and others have accused the church of discouraging pregnancy in anticipation that the world would end in 2012.

Lawsuits 

Michele Colon, a nurse from New Jersey, claimed, in a civil suit filed against WMSCOG in New Jersey, in 2013, that the group is a “profit-making” cult, and claimed it “uses a number of psychological control tactics … to prevent its members from exposing its criminal and tortious behavior.”

However, Colon's lawsuit was almost entirely rejected by the district and appellate state courts. Colon's claims, the court ruled, depended upon her claim that the WMSCOG is a “cult”, not a “church” — a determination that the courts ruled they were not allowed to make, by law. The courts, largely citing the “religious freedom” element of the First Amendment to the U.S. Constitution, particularly the judicial church autonomy doctrine (forbidding courts to inquire into “the facts and circumstances which intrude into church doctrine, affairs, and management”), the appellate court ruled that:

Paralyzing the telephone of Wonju municipal government 
The WMSCOG originally planned to purchase an LH office building in the city of Wonju in Gangwon, Korea planning to make it a religious place. Upon learning of this, the local residents formed the “Church of God residents emergency response committee” to oppose the church's actions. After that, the Wonju municipal government refused to allow the building to be used as a religious institution. As a result, from May 30 to June 1, 2016, the Wonju municipal government received more than 30,000 calls from members of the WMSCOG, which led to interference in the work of the municipal government. Following this, the Wonju municipal government issued a press release on June 2 stating: “This will be a phone paralysis operation of a religious organization.” Finally, two administrative proceedings were initiated by the WMSCOG, but all the appeals were rejected. “The reason why the administrative court refused the WMSCOG's request is because of traffic congestion and residents' complaints,” said Wonju municipal government official. Church of God residents emergency response committee said: “It is normal for the plaintiff to be rejected. We will never stop unless the true face of the WMSCOG is revealed.”

Rick Ross critique 
Rick Alan Ross, cult researcher and deprogrammer describes the WMSCOG as “a very intense group... similar to the Unification Church [of] Sun Myung Moon — the Moonies”, comparing WMSCOG indoctrination methods to those of the Unification Church.

Ross claims that the WMSCOG has driven members into “bankruptcies because of excessive donations”, and claims that some have lost their jobs to “excessive demands” of the group and associated “sleep deprivation”. He says that members often are sent to group housing and shared apartments, becoming isolated and alienated from family and friends, even spouses and adult children. Ross notes the group, which recruits members on university campuses, at malls and other shopping sites, has no meaningful accountability for leadership — a “dictatorship in Korea” — nor for the millions in revenue it receives.

Vietnam 
In Vietnam, the Committee for Religious Affairs urged vigilance about the group and cautioned that it should not be equated with other Protestant groups using similar names. Claiming the organization as cult-like, the government gratuitously cited the group as engaging in deceptive recruitment, with questionable and manipulative indoctrination, doomsday predictions, and urging the donation of cash and members' abandonment of their own families.

In May 2018, Vietnamese authorities seized the Church's assets in Hanoi, Saigon and in other provinces, and interrogated hundreds of its members. The Church leaders were accused of brainwashing its members and micromanaging their lives by urging students to abandon their studies and their workers to abandon their jobs in order to recruit more followers.

Recruitment and human trafficking rumors 
WMSCOG has been investigated for — and subsequently cleared of — human trafficking on multiple American university campuses. Police investigations into possible human sex trafficking connections ensued in January 2018 at the University of Mississippi, in September 2019 at the University of South Carolina, and in March 2020 at the University of Utah. Similar reports also occurred at the University of Louisville, Vanderbilt University, the University of Georgia, Oberlin College, Texas State University, and Arizona State University, among others. All investigations were closed after failing to find a link between the church and illicit activity.

Many students, across multiple campuses, reported unknown persons asking if they knew about “God the Mother.” Recruiters have been known to approach female students and ask if they believe in a female god, which often will lead to invitations to study groups. Recruiters will also approach students and ask if they would like to join a Bible study group.

This style of recruitment has come under fire from former church members, who have said that the church tends to target those who appear “psychologically vulnerable” and specifically young white people who appear wealthy.

New Zealand
In August 2017, the Otago University Students' Association in Dunedin disaffiliated the Elohim World Academy following complaints from students about deceptive and coercive recruitment methods. The University of Otago's Proctor Dave Scott had considered trespassing members of the group but ruled it out since that would have violated the New Zealand Bill of Rights Act 1990's provisions on religious freedom and freedom of expression. In 2020, the University of Auckland student magazine Craccum reported that members of the Elohim Academy had targeted students at the University of Auckland and the University of Waikato in Hamilton.

In September 2021, Craccum reported that the Elohim Academy was also conducting door-knocking evangelism campaigns in Wellington and Auckland, with an emphasis on recruiting young women. Members were expected to follow strict rules separating themselves from social media and non-church friends, attend masses and recruitment sessions, tithing ten percent of their income, avoid wearing jeans, reject music and masturbation, and losing weight to fit Korean beauty standards. Former members alleged that members including minors were shamed for not meeting the church's rules and standards and that members were ranked based on their recruitment rates. Church members were also reportedly shown graphic videos of Hell. In addition, pastors also arranged marriages between congregants.

Affiliated institutions 
 Okcheon Go&Come Training Institute
 Jounyisan Training Institute
 Elohim Training Institute
 The Church of God Theological Institute
 The Church of God History Museum
 The International WeLoveU Foundation
 Messiah Orchestra
 Saet-byul Kindergarten
 ASEZ, the World Mission Society Church of God University Student Volunteer Group
ASEZ WAO, the World Mission Society Church of God Young Adult Worker Volunteer Group

References

Notes

Citations

External links 

 World Mission Society Church of God Official website (English)
 World Mission Society Church of God Official website (Korean)
WATV Media Cast  Media website (English)
 World Mission Society Church of God in the U.S. USA based website (English)
 World Mission Society Church of God in Singapore Singapore based website (English)
 World Mission Society Church of God in Philippines Philippines based website (English)
 "NBC Investigates – World Mission Church of God...," December 4, 2016, The Today Show, host Ronan Farrow – NBC News on YouTube

1985 establishments in South Korea
Christian organizations established in 1985
Christian denominations established in the 20th century
Christian new religious movements
Religious organizations based in South Korea
Church of God denominations
Nontrinitarian denominations
Restorationism (Christianity)
Seventh-day denominations